Gregory of Tours (born Georgius Florentius; 30 November  538 – 17 November 594 AD) was a Gallo-Roman historian and Bishop of Tours during the Merovingian period. He was considered a leading prelate in the Merovingian kingdom, which encompassed the historical region of Gaul.

Gregory's most notable work is the Decem Libri Historiarum (Ten Books of Histories), also known as the Historia Francorum (History of the Franks), which is considered a primary source for the study of Merovingian history and chronicles the accounts of the Franks during the period. Gregory is also known for documenting accounts of religious figures, notably that of Martin of Tours. It is alleged that the Tomb of St. Martin became a Christian pilgrimage site in the 6th century, due in part to Gregory's writings.

Biography
Gregory was born in Clermont, in the Auvergne region of central Gaul. He was born into the upper stratum of Gallo-Roman society as the son of Florentius, Senator of Clermont, by his wife Armentaria II, niece of Bishop Nicetius of Lyon and granddaughter of both Florentinus, Senator of Geneva, and Saint Gregory of Langres. Gregory had several noted bishops and saints as close relatives (his family effectively monopolised the Bishoprics of Tours, Lyon, and Langres at the time of his birth), and, according to Gregory, he was connected to thirteen of the eighteen bishops of Tours preceding him by ties of kinship. Gregory's paternal grandmother, Leocadia, descended from Vettius Epagathus, the illustrious martyr of Lyon.

His father died while Gregory was young and his widowed mother moved to Burgundy where she had property. Gregory went to live with his paternal uncle St. Gallus, Bishop of Clermont, under whom, and his successor St. Avitus, Gregory had his education. Gregory also received the clerical tonsure from Gallus. Having contracted a serious illness, he made a visit of devotion to the tomb of St. Martin at Tours. Upon his recovery, he began to pursue a clerical career and was ordained deacon by Avitus. Upon the death of St. Euphronius, he was chosen as bishop by the clergy and people, who had been charmed with his piety, learning, and humility. Their deputies overtook him at the court of King Sigebert of Austrasia, and being compelled to acquiesce, though much against his will, Gregory was consecrated by Giles, Bishop of Rheims, on 22 August 573, at the age of thirty-four.

He spent most of his career at Tours, although he assisted at the council of Paris in 577. The rough world he lived in was on the cusp of the dying world of Antiquity and the new culture of early medieval Europe. Gregory lived also on the border between the Frankish culture of the Merovingians to the north and the Gallo-Roman culture of the south of Gaul.

At Tours, Gregory could not have been better placed to hear everything and meet every one of influence in Merovingian culture. Tours lay on the watery highway of the navigable Loire. Five Roman roads radiated from Tours, which lay on the main thoroughfare between the Frankish north and Aquitania, with Spain beyond. At Tours the Frankish influences of the north and the Gallo-Roman influences of the south had their chief contact (see map). As the center for the popular cult of St Martin, Tours was a pilgrimage site, hospital, and a political sanctuary to which important leaders fled during periods of violence and turmoil in Merovingian politics.

Gregory struggled through personal relations with four Frankish kings, Sigebert I, Chilperic I, Guntram, and Childebert II, and he personally knew most of the leading Franks.

Works
Gregory wrote in Late Latin, which frequently departed from classical usage in both syntax and spelling, though with relatively few changes in inflection.

History of the Franks

Summary
Gregory of Tours' history is a dense work, with numerous narratives and characters. It contains Christian tales of miracles, descriptions of omens and natural events, stories of Christian martyrs, dialogues of church debates, discussions of the lives of holy men, nobility, and eccentric peasants, frequent Bible verses and references, and explorations of the complex international relations between numerous tribes and nations including the Lombards, Visigoths, Ostrogoths and Huns, not to mention Gregory's personal biography and interpretation of events.

Book 1
Book One begins with a pronouncement by the author that he is a Frankish Catholic clergyman who follows the Nicene Creed and abhors heresy like those of the “wicked” Arian sect among other heresies. The narrative history begins with a brief epitome of the Biblical Old Testament, New Testament and the subsequent spread of the Christian Religion into Gaul. Next Gregory covers the history of Christianity in Gaul and some of the major events in Roman-Gallo relations. It ends with the death of Saint Martin of Tours in 397.

Book 2 (397-511)
Book Two covers the beginnings of the Merovingian dynasty, including King Clovis I's conversion to Christianity by his wife Clotilde and ending with his death in 511, after his conquest of large tracts of land in modern-day France.

Book 3 (511-548)
Book Three follows the four sons of King Clovis who equally divide his realms after his death in 511. These four kings, Theuderic I, Clothar I, Childebert I, and Chlodomer, quarrel and fight for supremacy of the Frankish realm. Despite their disputes, they occasionally work together against an outside threat, such as their attack of the Burgundians in 523. Eventually Clothar becomes the most powerful King in the Frankish realm. After the death of King Theoderic I in 534, Book Three ends with the death of his son and successor King Theudebert I in 548. After 548, the kingdom is inherited by Theudebald until his death in 555.

Book 4 (548-575)
Book Four continues from when the two remaining sons of Clovis die: King Childebert in 558 and King Clothar in 561. The last years of his life see the entire realm of the Franks ruled by Clothar. At the time of his demise in 561 (like Clovis before him), the Kingdom is divided equally between four sons of Clothar; King Charibert I, King Sigibert I, King Guntram and King Chilperic I and their quarrel for control of the entire kingdom. A truce between them is maintained until after the death of King Charibert I in 567. Clothar's remaining sons fight for the supremacy of the kingdom, with King Sigibert showing the strongest military force. Book Four ends with the killing of King Sigbert in 575, leaving King Chilperic as the dominant king. Gregory of Tours blames Fredegund, the wife of King Chilperic, for this assassination. Fredegund has long held a grudge against King Sigibert and his wife Brunhilda.

Book 5 (575-581) 
Book Five begins the part where the author has much personal knowledge about the events in the Frankish Kingdom. This book and the ones after, are considerably longer and more detailed than the previous, whilst covering a shorter amount of time. This book also contains Gregory's impressions of ecclesiastical issues he witnessed and had some bearing on. It describes a possible debate that Gregory had with a rival Arian church leader. Moreover, book 5 also introduces Childebert II, the son of recently slain King Sigibert, and of the still living Brunhilda. Childebert is taken along with Brunhilda under the protection of King Gunthram, brother and sometime rival of King Chilperic.

Book 6 (581-584) 
In Book Six, the young Childebert betrays his alliance with his adoptive uncle King Gunthram, who had protected Childebert and his mother after his father Sigibert's death. Now Childebert forms an alliance with his uncle, King Chilperic, who had often been an enemy of King Sigibert. Later, King Chilperic is murdered under mysterious circumstances in 584.

Book 7 (584) 
In Book Seven, Fredegund assumes regency for her young son Clothar II. In the future he will be king of all Franks until his death in 629, beyond Gregory's narrative which ends in roughly 593. Fredegund and her son are under the protection of King Gunthram. She remains in power until her death in 597. Also in this book is the rebellion of Gundovald and its failure. Gundovald claimed to be a lost illegitimate son of dead King Chlothar I. Many of the Frankish nobles and the Byzantine emperor Maurice gave some support to this rebellion; however, it is swiftly crushed by King Guntram.

Book 8 (585) 
“Many evil things were done at this time” as Gregory writes in Book VIII. It begins with the travels of King Guntram to Paris and Orleans and describes numerous confrontations between the king and some bishops. Meanwhile, king Guntram becomes ill and fears for his life. Gregory comments that the king's illness is a just punishment since he is planning to send a great number of bishops into exile. Fredegund gives two poisoned daggers to two clerics and sends them away with the order to assassinate King Childebert and Brunehild. However, the two clerics are arrested by Childebert, tortured and executed. Meanwhile, Fredegund is also behind the assassination of Bishop Praetextus of Rouen while he is praying in his church. King Guntram orders his army to march against Arian Septimania and Spain without success and blames his army commanders for having allowed atrocities and random destruction.

Book 9 (586-587) 
In Book Nine, the Treaty of Andelot is signed in 587 between King Guntram, Brunhilda, and King Childebert II. The treaty is a close pact of alliance, wherein Childebert is formally adopted as Guntram's heir. Brunhilda also formally allies with Guntram and comes under his protection.

Book 10 (587-591) 
The last book is set around 589. Basina, the daughter of King Chilperic I and Clotilda, daughter of King Charibert leads a brief revolt from a nunnery. The 18 Bishops of Tours are named and described. It ends with a summary of Gregory's previous written works.

Analysis 
The Historia Francorum is made up of ten books. Books I to IV initially recount the world's history from the Creation (as was traditional); but move quickly on to the Christianization of Gaul, the life and times of Saint Martin of Tours, the conversion of the Franks and the conquest of Gaul under Clovis, and the more detailed history of the Frankish kings down to the death of Sigebert I in 575. At this date Gregory had been bishop of Tours for two years.

With his fifth book, Gregory embarks (with some relief) on contemporary history, opening “Here, I am glad to say, begins Book V”. This, the second part of his history, books V and VI, closes with Chilperic I's death in 584. During the years that Chilperic held Tours, relations between him and Gregory were tense. After hearing rumours that the Bishop of Tours had slandered his wife, Fredegund, Chilperic had Gregory arrested and tried for treason – a charge which threatened both Gregory's bishopric and his life. The most eloquent passage in the Historia is the closing chapter of book VI, in which Chilperic's character is summed up unsympathetically through the use of an invective: Herod and Nero are among the comparisons employed.

The third part, comprising books VII to X, takes his increasingly personal account to the year 591, and concludes with a plea for further chroniclers to preserve his work in entirety (as indeed would be done). An epilogue was written in 594, the year of Gregory's death.

Problems of interpretation

Readers of the Historia Francorum must decide whether this is a royal history or whether Gregory was writing to please his patrons. It is likely that one royal Frankish house is more generously treated than others. Gregory was also a Catholic bishop, and his writing reveals views typical of someone in his position. His views on perceived dangers of Arianism, still strong among the Visigoths, led him to preface the Historia with a detailed expression of his orthodoxy on the nature of Christ. In addition, his ridiculing of pagans and Jews reflected how his works were used to spread the Christian faith. For example, in book 2, chapters 28–31, he describes the pagans as incestuous and weak and then describes the process by which newly converted King Clovis leads a much better life than that of a pagan and is healed of all the conundrums he experienced as a pagan.

Gregory's education was the standard Latin one of Late Antiquity, focusing on Virgil's Aeneid and Martianus Capella's Liber de Nuptiis Mercurii et Philologiae, but also other key texts such as Orosius's Chronicles, which his Historia continues, and Sallust; he refers to all these works in his own. His education, as was typical for the time, did not extend to a broad acquaintance with the pagan classics, but rather progressed to mastery of the Vulgate Bible. It is said that he constantly complained about his use of grammar. He did not understand how to correctly write masculine and feminine phrases, reflecting either a lack of ability or changes in the Latin language. Though he had read Virgil, considered the greatest Latin stylist, he cautions that "We ought not to relate their lying fables, lest we fall under sentence of eternal death." By contrast, he seems to have thoroughly studied the lengthy and complex Vulgate Bible, as well as numerous religious works and historical treatises, which he frequently quotes, particularly in the earlier books of the Historia.

The main impression that historians once retained from the Historia focused on Gregory's anecdotes about violence; until recently, historians tended to conclude that Merovingian Gaul was a chaotic, brutal mess. Recent scholarship has refuted that view. Through more careful readings, scholars have concluded that Gregory's underlying purpose was to highlight the vanity of secular life and contrast it with the miracles of the Saints. Though Gregory conveys political and other messages through the Historia, and these are studied very closely, historians now generally agree that this contrast is the central and ever-present narrative device.

Hagiographies

His Life of the Fathers comprises twenty hagiographies of the most prominent men of the preceding generation, taking in a wide range the spiritual community of early medieval Gaul, including lives of bishops, clerics, monks, abbots, holy men and hermits. St. Illidius is praised for his purity of heart, St. Brachio the abbot for his discipline and determination in study of the scriptures, St Patroclus for his unwavering faith in the face of weakness, and St. Nicetius, bishop of Lyon, for his justice. It is the life of St. Nicetius of Trier, though, which dominates this book; his great authority and sense of episcopal responsibility which is the focus of Gregory's account as his figure, predestined to be great, bestrides the lives of the others. It is told that he felt a weight on his head, but he was unable to see what it was when turning around, though upon smelling its sweet scent he realised that it was the weight of episcopal responsibility. (Life of the Fathers, XVII, 1) He surmounts the others in the glory of his miracles and was chosen by God to have the entire succession of past and future Frankish kings revealed to him.

A further aspect of this work to note is the appearance of Gregory himself in certain sections, notably in the life of St. Leobardus. This is for two reasons: Firstly, it creates a distinct link between the temporal and the spiritual worlds, firmly placing the accounts of the lives in a world which is understandable and recognisable, or, seen from the other angle, confirming the presence of miracles in the temporal world.

In 587, Gregory began writing the Book of the Glories of the Martyrs (Liber in gloria martyrum), which deals “almost exclusively with the miracles wrought in Gaul by the martyrs of the Roman persecutions.” But it also tells the story of one Theodore who made a pilgrimage to India and reported the existence of a large monastery where the body of Thomas the Apostle was first interred and where miracles took place.

Fighting heresy

Gregory's avowed aim in writing this book was to "fire others with that enthusiasm by which the saints deservedly climbed to heaven", though this was not his sole purpose, and he most surely did not expect his entire audience to show promise of such piety as to witness the power of God flowing through them in the way that it did for the fathers. More immediate concerns were at the forefront of his mind as he sought to create a further layer of religious commitment, not only to the Church at Rome, but also to local churches and cathedrals throughout Gaul. Along with his other books (notably the Glory of the Confessors, the Glory of the Martyrs, and the Life of St. Martin), meticulous attention is paid to the local as opposed to the universal Christian experience. Within these grandiloquent lives are tales and anecdotes which tie miracles, saints, and their relics to a great diversity of local areas, furnishing his audience with greater knowledge of their local shrine, and providing them with evidence of the work of God in their immediate vicinity, thus greatly expanding their connection with and understanding of their faith. Attacks on heresy also appear throughout his hagiographies; Arianism is taken to be the common face of heresy across Europe, exposed to great ridicule. Often, the scenes which expose the weaknesses of heresy (Glory of the Martyrs, 79, 80) focus on images of fire and burning, whilst the Catholics are proved right by the protection lavished on them by God.

This was of great relevance to Gregory himself as he presided over the important see of Tours, where extensive use was made of the cult of St. Martin in establishing the authority of the bishopric with the congregation and in the context of the Frankish church. Gregory's hagiography was an essential component of this. However, this should not be seen as a selfish grab for power on behalf of the bishops who emerge so triumphantly from the Life of the Fathers, but rather as a bid for hegemony of doctrine and control over the practice of worship, which they believed to be in the best interests of their congregation and the wider church.

Gregory's Creed
As an example of Gregory's zeal in his fight against heresy, the Historia Francorum includes a declaration of faith with which Gregory aimed to prove his orthodoxy with respect to the heresies of his time ("so that my reader may have no doubt that I am Catholic for they are."). The confession is in many phrases, each of which refutes a specific Christian heresy. Thus, Gregory's creed presents, in the negative, a virtual litany of heresies:

Legacy

The Historia Francorum is a central source for early Frankish history, representing the period of transition from late Roman antiquity to early Medieval times in a nascent Europe. It is believed to be the only reliable source of information to describe the emerging military and political power of the Franks in one kingdom.

Gregory has often been compared to Herodotus; with his detailed interest in, and accounts of, ecclesiastical history and maneuverings, to a bloodier Trollope. Robert Win came to the conclusion:

"There can be no argument that Gregory deliberately structured his narrative to protect himself from any political attacks and that it was the political circumstances around him that governed what he could and could not write.’ Gregory's Latin was relatively poor in comparison with earlier centuries when writers were educated at secular Roman grammar and rhetorics schools and could write in learned Latin. He himself is aware of it and apologizes for his poor Latin in his Introduction:"Ista etenim atque et his similia iugiter intuens dici, pro commemoratione praeteritorum, ut notitiam adtingerint venientum, etsi incultu effatu, nequivi tamen obtegere vel certamena flagitiosorum vel vitam recte viventium; 

et praesertim his inlicitus stimulis, quod a nostris fari plerumque miratus sum, quia: 'Philosophantem rethorem intellegunt pauci, loquentem rusticum multi' 

('Hearing continually these complaints and others like them I have undertaken to commemorate the past, in order that it may come to the knowledge of the future; and although my speech is rude, I have been unable to be silent as to the struggles between the wicked and the upright; and I have been especially encouraged because, to my surprise, it has often been said by men of our day, that few understand the learned words of the rhetorician but many the rude language of the common people.')

'The 'Historia Francorum' is the only source of that period covering the beginning of the Franks in the decaying Roman Empire from around 397 (the death of Martin of Tours) to 590 (the early reign of king Chlothar II). Gregory's chronology of the Franks is continued with the Fourth Book of Fredegar and its continuations for the events up to 642. Likewise, the fourth Book of Fredegar and its continuations is the only source of any significance for much of the period it covers.Gregory's hagiographies are also a valuable source of anecdotes and stories which enrich modern understanding of life and belief in Merovingian Gaul. The motivation behind his works was to show readers the importance and strength of Christianity, and this bias should always be remembered. Alongside the most outstanding poet Venantius Fortunatus in his lifetime, Gregory of Tours is the unique historian from the 6th century Merovingian world; and his extensive literary output is itself a testimony to the preservation of learning and to the lingering continuity of Gallo-Roman civic culture through the early Middle Ages.

See also

References

The following represent key modern texts on Gregory of Tours, including the most recent translations of his work.

While Lewis Thorpe's translation of The History of the Franks is more accessible than Brehaut's, his introduction and commentary are not well regarded by contemporary historians (see Secondary Sources, below).

Primary sources

Editions

 Gregorii episcopi Turonensis. Libri Historiarum X (ed. Bruno Krusch and Wilhelm Levison), MGH SRM I 1, Hannover2 1951
 Miracula et opera minora (ed. Bruno Krusch), MGH SRM I 2, Hannover 1969, 211-294 (repr. from 1885)

Translations

 Fränkische Geschichte. 3 vols. (transl. by Wilhelm von Giesebrecht, rev. by Manfred Gebauer), Essen 1988.
 From Roman to Merovingian Gaul. A Reader (ed. and transl. Alexander Callander Murray; Readings in medieval Civilisations and Cultures 5), Toronto 2000, 287-446
 Glory of the confessors (ed. and transl. Raymond Van Dam; Translated Texts for Historians 4), Liverpool 2004 (2nd edition), .
 Glory of the Martyrs (ed. and transl. Raymond Van Dam; Translated Texts for Historians 3), Liverpool 2004 (2nd edition), .
 Liber de passione et virtutibus sancti Iuliani martyris und Libri de virtutibus sancti Martini episcopi, in: Raymond Van Dam (ed.), Saints and their Miracles in Late Antique Gaul, Princeton 1993, 153–317.
 Life of the Fathers (ed. and transl. James Edward; Translated Texts for Historians 1), Liverpool 1991 (2nd edition), .
 The History of the Franks (transl. M. Dalton), Oxford 1927.
 The History of the Franks (transl. L. Thorpe), Penguin 1974.
 Historias (transl. P. Herrera), Servicio de Publicaciones de la Universidad de Extremadura, 2013, 
 Histoire des Franks, in French
 Vita Patrum (ed. and transl. Fr. Seraphim Rose), St. Herman of Alaska Brotherhood, 1988, .

Bilingual editions

 Les livres des miracles et autres opuscules de Georges Florent Grégoire évêque de Tours (ed. and transl. Léonard Bordier), vol. 1, Paris 1857.
 Zehn Bücher Geschichten. Band I-II.(ed. and transl. Wilhelm Giesebrecht and Rudolf Buchner), Darmstadt 1955–1956.

Secondary sources
 Bianchi, Dante, Da Gregorio Di Tours a Paolo Diacono, Aevum, Anno XXXV, Fasc. 1/2 (1961), pp. 150-166.
 Bonnet, Max, Le Latin de Grégoire de Tours, Paris: Librairie Hachette, 1890.
 Brown, Peter, The Cult of the Saints, London 1981. 
 Butzmann, Hans, Die Wolfenbütteler Fragmente der Historien des Gregor von Tours, Scriptorium, XX/1 (Année 1966), pp. 31-40 
 Caires, Valerie Anne, Evagrius Scholasticus and Gregory of Tours: A Literary Comparison, Unpublished PhD thesis, University of California, Berkeley, 1976.
 Cameron, Averil, "The Byzantine Sources of Gregory of Tours", The Journal of Theological Studies, New Series, Vol. XXVI, No. 2 (October1975), pp. 421-426.
 Choda, Kamil, "Intellectual Sources of Historian's Legitimization - The Case of Gregory of Tours", Classica Cracoviensia, Vol. XVIII (2015), pp. 111-124.
 Choda, Kamil, "The Religious Other in the Histories of Gregory of Tours", Classica Cracoviensia, Vol. XVII (2014), pp. 5-19.
 Cuzzolin, Pierluigi, Osservazioni sul rapporto tra grafia e fonetica nel latino di Gregorio di Tours, XI Congreso International sobre el Latín Vulgar y Tardío (Oviedo, 1-5 de septiembre de 2014), eds. García Leal, Alfonso, Prieto Entrialgo, Clara Elena, Hildesheim Zürich Olms-Weidmann, 2017, p. 193-206.
 Dailey, E.T., Queens, Consorts, Concubines: Gregory of Tours and Women of the Merovingian Elite, Leiden, Brill, 2015.
 Diem, Albrecht, “Gregory’s Chess Board: Monastic Conflict and Competition in Early Medieval Gaul”, in Compétition et sacré au haut Moyen Âge: entre médiation et exclusion, Philippe Depreux, François Bougard and Régine Le Jan (eds.), Brepols, Turnhout 2015, pp. 165–191.
 Ersoy, Tolga, "Gregorius Turonensis’in 'Decem Libri Historiarum' Adlı Yapıtında Hunlara ve Avarlara Dair Kayıtların Değerlendirilmesi", Bozkırın Oğlu: Ahmet Taşağıl’a Armağan, ed. Tuğba Eray Biber, İstanbul, 2019, pp. 115-122. 
 Goetz, Hans-Werner, "Grégoire de Tours: (comment) a-t-il perçu une «coopétition»?", Coopétition: Rivaliser, coopérer dans les sociétés du haut Moyen Âge (500-1100) (Haut Moyen Âge, 31), eds. Régine Le Jan, Geneviève Bührer-Thierry, and Stefano Gasparri, Turnhout: Brepols Publishers, 2018, pp. 49-60.
 Goffart, Walter, "Foreigners in the Histories of Gregory of Tours", Florilegium, Vol. IV, No. 1 (1982), 80-89.
 Goffart, Walter, The Narrators of Barbarian History (A.D. 550–800): Jordanes, Gregory of Tours, Bede and Paul the Deacon, Princeton 1988.
 Hailstone, Catherine-Rose, Fear in the Mind and Works of Gregory of Tours, Unpublished PhD thesis, University of York, 2020.
 Heinzelmann, Martin, Gregory of Tours: History and Society in the Sixth Century, trans. Christopher Carroll, Cambridge 2001.
 James, E.,The Franks, Oxford 1988.
 Kaiser, Reinhold, Das römische Erbe und das Merowingerreich, München 2004 (Enzyklopädie deutscher Geschichte 26).
 Keely, A., "Arians and Jews in the "Histories" of Gregory of Tours", Journal of Medieval History, Vol. XXIII/2 (1997), pp. 103-115.
 Loseby, S.T., “Marseille and the Pirenne thesis, I: Gregory of Tours, the Merovingian kings and 'un grand port'” in The Sixth Century. Production, Distribution and Demand, edited by Richard Hodges and William Bowden, pp. 203–229, Brill Academic Publishers, Leiden 1998.
 Loseby, S.T., “Gregory's cities: urban functions in sixth-century Gaul”, in Franks and Alamanni in the Merovingian period: an Ethnographic Perspective, edited by Ian N. Wood, Boydell & Brewer Ltd, Woodbridge 1998, pp. 239–270.
 McSheffrey, Shannon, The History of the Franks, Harmondsworth 1974.
 Mitchell. Kathleen; Wood. Ian (eds.), The World of Gregory of Tours, Leiden 2002.
 Moorhead, John, "Gregory of Tours on the Arian kingdoms", Studi medievali, Anno XXXVI, Fasc. 2 (1995), pp. 903-915.
 Murray, A.C. (ed.), A Companion to Gregory of Tours, Leiden 2016.
 Nie, Giselle de, Views from a Many-Windowed Tower: Studies of Imagination in the Works of Gregory of Tours, Amsterdam, Rodopi, 1987.
 Serra, Antonio, “L’ingenium artis di Gregorio di Tours. Preliminari d’indagine”, Invigilata Lucernis 32 (2010), pp. 157–175.
 Van Dam, Raymond, Saints and their miracles in late antique Gaul, Princeton 1993.
 Vieillard-Troiekouroff, May, Les monuments religieux de la Gaule d'après les oeuvres de Grégoire de Tours, Paris: H. Champion, 1976
 Vogüé, Adalbert de, "Grégoire le Grand, lecteur de Grégoire de Tours?", Analecta Bollandiana, Vol. XCIV, Issue 3-4 (1976), pp. 225-233.
 Wagner, Norbert, "Geirom studdo (Vsp. 21,4) und Gregor von Tours", Zeitschrift für deutsches Altertum und deutsche Literatur, 114. Bd., H. 2 (2nd Quarter, 1985), pp. 89-91.
 Wood, Ian N., Gregory of Tours, Bangor (GB) 1994.
 Wood, Ian N., The Merovingian kingdoms 450-751, London 1994.
 Wood, Ian N. "The secret histories of Gregory of Tours", Revue belge de Philologie et d'Histoire, LXXII/2 (Année 1993), pp. 253-270.

External links

 
 
 
 Staatsbibliothek Bamberg Msc.Patr.61 , the primary witness of De cursu stellarum
 
 History lecture by Paul Freedman on Procopius and Gregor of Tours in Yale University (fall 2011): https://www.youtube.com/watch?v=pbN8OTHecuI
 

538 births
594 deaths
6th-century apocalypticists
6th-century Frankish bishops
6th-century Frankish saints
6th-century Frankish writers
6th-century historians
6th-century Latin writers
Bishops of Tours
Christian anti-Gnosticism
Frankish historians
Hagiographers
Clergy from Clermont-Ferrand
Historia Francorum
6th-century Gallo-Roman people
Writers from Clermont-Ferrand